Neoeromene herstanella is a moth in the family Crambidae. It was described by William Schaus in 1922. It is found in Panama and Costa Rica.

The wingspan is about 9 mm. Adults have been recorded on wing in February.

References

Diptychophorini
Moths described in 1922